Todd Novascone (born July 31, 1972) is an American politician who served in the Kansas House of Representatives from the 99th district from 2001 to 2005.

References

External links
Todd Novascone Vote Smart

1972 births
Living people
Republican Party members of the Kansas House of Representatives
Baylor University alumni
21st-century American politicians